This is a list of the best-selling singles in 1992 in Japan, as reported by Oricon.

See also
List of Oricon number-one singles of 1992

References

1992 in Japanese music
1992
Oricon
Japanese music-related lists